Autophagin-1 (Atg4/Apg4) is a unique cysteine protease responsible for the cleavage of the carboxyl terminus of Atg8/Apg8/Aut7, a reaction essential for its lipidation during autophagy. Human Atg4 homologues cleave the carboxyl termini of the three human Atg8 homologues, microtubule-associated protein light chain 3 (LC3), GABARAP, and GATE-16.

The rapid advancement in our understanding of the mechanisms and regulation of autophagy has placed this process in the center of current research in major human disorders. The future challenge is to develop easy methods to separately manipulate the activity of each of the autophagic pathways. This would allow researchers to further understand their contribution to disease such as cancer, neurodegeneration, infectious disease, muscular disorders and possibly will provide therapeutic tools.

See also 
Autophagy
Apoptosis
Ubiquitin

References

EC 3.4.22
Post-translational modification
Cellular processes